Husna was a Pakistani actress in the late 1950s to 1970s, who worked in Pakistani cinema. She made her debut in 1958 and mostly appeared in supporting roles in the films. She was the recipient of Nigar Award for Best Supporting Actress.

Made her debut as a child actor with Shaukat Hussain Rizvi's Jan-e-Bahar (1958), Husna never became a top heroine and mainly played the side-heroine or vamp roles in Urdu and Punjabi films during her almost 30 years long career. Her big breakthrough came with Ajab Khan (1961), starring opposite Sudhir. Her other appearances include Changez Khan (1958), Rani Khan (1960), and  Dosti (1971), among other musical films. She retired after acting in more than 150 films.

Major films
 Jaan-e-Bahar (1958)
 Changez Khan (1958)
 Nagin (1959)
 Sathi (1959)
 Rani Khan (1960)
 Farishta (1961)
 Ajab Khan (1961)
 Shaheed (1962)
 Naila (1965)
 Behan Bhai (1968)
 Neela Parbat (1969)
 Dosti (1971)
 Sajan Milde Kadi Kadi (1972)
 Sabaq (1972)
 Jaal (1973)
 Surraya Bhopali (1976)

Awards
 Husna received the Best Supporting Actress Nigar Award in 1972 for film Sabaq.

See also
 List of Lollywood actors

References

External links
 

Pakistani film actresses
Nigar Award winners
Actresses from Lahore
20th-century Pakistani actresses